Cybertill is a cloud-based retail software provider, which incorporates ecommerce, stock control, CRM, Merchandising and Warehousing modules. Cybertill’s headquarters are in Knowsley, near Liverpool, in the UK. The company is privately owned and funded by Merseyside Investment Fund (MSIF). and employs over 100 people.

History
Cybertill was founded by current CEO Ian Tomlinson in 2001. 
Its software offering consisted of EPoS, ecommerce and mail order systems delivered over an internet connection (referred to as cloud-based software). In late 2001 Cybertill secured funding from Merseyside Investment Fund (MSIF). Cybertill claims to be the world’s first cloud based EPoS and ecommerce system.

Cybertill’s first customer was a bike shop in York in 2001. By 2014, according to the company’s website, there are over 650 retailers using its system.

The company says it is currently migrating users to its latest iteration of its software entitled Retail Store.

In 2014 Cybertill announced it was developing new supply chain modules. These are merchandising and warehousing.

In 2020, Cybertill has collaborated with the Bicycle Association's Market Data Service. This builds on the already developed direct relationships with EPos till the suppliers Abacus, Ascend, Citrus-Lime and Seanic Retail.

Features
Cybertill is a cloud based retail system which incorporates EPoS, ecommerce and mail order applications. These modules allow retailers to carry out the following tasks such as stock control, ordering, managing promotions and loyalty programmes.

Cybertill also supplies a charity retail system, this includes an additional module for gift aid software. This enables charity retailers to claim gift aid on donated goods.

As well as having its own proprietary ecommerce platform, Cybertill claims that it can integrate with a variety of third party ecommerce platforms such as Magento. Several Magento companies such as Juno and Limesharp promote the fact that they work with Cybertill customers.

Reception
Cybertill has been featured by national newspapers such as The Guardian and The Financial Times as well as retail trade publications such as Retail Week, Drapers, and Retail Technology, and online news sites including professionaljeweller.com, retailgazette.co.uk, and theintegratedretailer.com

In recent times Cybertill has been included in TechMarketView’s British Battlers Tech Media Invest Top 100 and London Stock Exchange Group’s 1000 Companies to Inspire Britain in 2013

Services 
IT advice, project management, service delivery management, personalised training bundles, and API & integration.

References

2001 establishments in the United Kingdom
Software companies of the United Kingdom
Metropolitan Borough of Knowsley
Point of sale companies
Companies based in Merseyside